Soul Survivor is the fourth studio album by Dutch death metal band Gorefest, released in 1996 via Nuclear Blast.

Track listing
 "Freedom" (Boudewijn Bonebakker, Jan Chris de Koeyer, Ed Warby) 4:32
 "Forty Shades" (Bonebakker, de Koeyer, Warby)  4:14
 "River" (Bonebakker, de Koeyer, Warby) 4:33
 "Electric Poet" (Bonebakker, de Koeyer, Warby) 4:20
 "Soul Survivor" (Bonebakker, de Koeyer) 4:30
 "Blood Is Thick" (de Koeyer, Frank Harthoon) 3:41
 "Dog Day" (Bonebakker, de Koeyer, Harthoon) 2:51
 "Demon Seed" (Bonebakker, de Koeyer, Warby) 3:46
 "Chameleon" (Bonebakker, de Koeyer) 2:45
 "Dragon Man" (Bonebakker, de Koeyer) 6:38

Bonus tracks
"Tired Moon" 4:26
"Goddess in Black" (orchestral version) 6:34

Band members
 Jan-Chris de Koeijer – vocals, bass guitar
 Frank Harthoorn – guitar
 Boudewijn Bonebakker – guitar
 Ed Warby – drums
 Rene Merkelbach – mellotron and grand piano

References 

1996 albums
Gorefest albums
Nuclear Blast albums